Yamileth Solórzano (born 29 May 1988) is a Salvadoran boxer. She competed in the women's featherweight event at the 2020 Summer Olympics.

References

External links
 

1988 births
Living people
Salvadoran women boxers
Olympic boxers of El Salvador
Boxers at the 2020 Summer Olympics
Pan American Games competitors for El Salvador
Boxers at the 2019 Pan American Games
Sportspeople from San Salvador